The 2009 Black-Eyed Susan Stakes was the 85th running of the Black-Eyed Susan Stakes. The race took place in Baltimore, Maryland on May 15, 2009, and was televised in the United States on the Bravo TV network owned by NBC. Ridden by jockey Terry Thompson, Payton d'Oro, won the race by one and one quarter lengths over runner-up Bon Jovi Girl. Approximate post time on the evening before the Preakness Stakes was 5:50 p.m. Eastern Time and the race was run for a purse of $150,000. The race was run over a fast track in a final time of 1:49.75. The Maryland Jockey Club reported total attendance of 23,819.

Payout 

The 85th Black-Eyed Susan Stakes Payout Schedule

$2 Exacta:  (2–5) paid   $62.80

$2 Trifecta:  (2–5–7) paid   $166.60

$1 Superfecta:  (2–5–7–6) paid   $809.30

The full chart 

 Winning Breeder: T/C Stable & James Catter; (KY)  
 Final Time: 1:49.75
 Track Condition: Fast
 Total Attendance: 23,819

See also 
 2009 Preakness Stakes
 Black-Eyed Susan Stakes Stakes "top three finishers" and # of starters

References

External links 
 Official Black-Eyed Susan Stakes website
 Official Preakness website

2009 in horse racing
2009 in American sports
2009 in sports in Maryland
Black-Eyed Susan Stakes
Horse races in Maryland